The Embassy of Greece in Washington, D.C. is the Hellenic Republic's diplomatic mission to the United States. It is located at 2217 Massachusetts Avenue, Northwest, Washington, D.C. in the Embassy Row neighborhood, near Sheridan Circle. The Embassy complex consists of three buildings. The current ambassador is Alexandra Papadopoulou (since 2020) and first woman in this post.

History 
After the War of Independence, which started in 1821, Greece was declared an independent state but it was not until 3 February 1830 that the Independence was recognized by the Great Powers with the signing of the Protocol of London. On 7 May 1832 Otto of Greece arrived in Nafplion and Greece became a Kingdom. The United States, however, recognized the Greek state only in 1833. In December 1837 a commercial treaty was signed, which regulated trade between the two countries. The first Greek consulate to be established was that of New Orleans, in 1866. Records indicate that Nicolas Benachi was the first Greek consul in New Orleans. In 1867, Demetrios Nicholas Botassis was named Consul General of Greece in New York City.

Former Ambassadors 

December 23, 1907 Lambros Koromilas, Minister Resident
July 29, 1909 Lambros Koromilas
March 13, 1913 A. Vouros, Charge d'Affaires
August 17, 1914 Agamemnon Schliemann
December 7, 1914 A. Vouros, Charge d’Affaires a.i.
September 21, 1917 
October 25, 1920 Georgios Drakopoulos, in charge of Legation
December 15, 1920 Georgios Drakopoulos Charge d’Affaires a.i.
January 11, 1923 , Charge d’Affaires a.i.
May 22, 1924 , Charge d'Affaires a.i.
June 30, 1924 Vasilios Mammonos, Charge d'Affaires a.i.
August 21, 1924 Konstantinos D. Xanthopoulos, Charge d’Affaires a.i.
December 12, 1924 Charalambos Simopoulos
April 26, 1935 Dimitrios Sikelianos
February 7, 1940 

Legation raised to Embassy
October 6, 1942 
December 6, 1946 Pavlos Oikonomou-Gouras, Charge d'Affaires a.i.
June 3, 1947 
December 8, 1954 Athanase George Politis
October 6, 1958 
February 13, 1962 Alexandros Matsas
September 20, 1967 
November 13, 1969 Basil Vitsaksis
December 1, 1972 Ioannis Argyrios Sorokos
February 27, 1974 
September 3, 1974 
August 16, 1979 , Charge d’Affaires ad interim
September 4, 1979 
December 15, 1981 Georgios Sioris, Charge d’Affaires ad interim
January 13, 1982 Nikolaos Karandreas
September 10, 1983 Georgios Sioris, Charge d'Affaires ad interim
September 19, 1983 Georgios Papoulias
September 21, 1989 
June 15, 1993 
July 6, 1998 Alexander Philon
July 2, 2002 Georgios Savvaidis

Consulates 
The Embassy is also responsible for other eight Greek diplomatic missions (six consulates-general and two consulates) throughout the United States, each one responsible for certain states:

 General Consulates
 Consulate General in Boston States of Jurisdiction: Maine, Massachusetts, New Hampshire, Rhode Island, Vermont
 Consulate General in Chicago States of Jurisdiction: Illinois, Indiana, Iowa, Kansas, Michigan, Minnesota, Missouri, North Dakota, Nebraska, Ohio, South Dakota, Wisconsin
 Consulate General in Los Angeles States of Jurisdiction: Arizona, California (Zip Codes 90001-92999), Colorado, Hawaii, Nevada, New Mexico, South Nevada
 Consulate General in New York City States of Jurisdiction : Connecticut, New Jersey, New York, Pennsylvania
 Consulate General in San Francisco States of Jurisdiction: Alaska, California (Zip Codes 93000 and up), Idaho, Montana, North Nevada, Oregon, Utah, Washington, Wyoming
 Consulate General in Tampa States of Jurisdiction: Alabama, Florida, Mississippi
 Consulates
 Consulate in Atlanta States of Jurisdiction: Georgia, Kentucky, South Carolina, Tennessee
 Consulate in Houston States of Jurisdiction: Oklahoma, Texas, Arkansas, Louisiana, Puerto Rico, US Virgin Islands

See also 
 Consulate General of the United States in Thessaloniki
 Diplomatic missions of Greece
 Statue of Eleftherios Venizelos, installed outside the embassy
 Embassy of the United States in Athens
 Foreign relations of Greece
 Greece–United States relations
 List of diplomatic missions in Washington, D.C.
 List of ambassadors of the United States to Greece

References

External links

 

Greece
Washington, D.C.
Greece
Greece–United States relations
Greek-American culture in Washington, D.C.
 
United States
Greece